Bjerke Upper Secondary School is a high school based in Groruddalen in Oslo, Norway. It offers general academics and elite sports. In 2000 the school changed its name from Linderud Upper Secondary School to Bjerke.

The school was notable for having introduced, in 2011, a system of segregating ethnic and white students to discourage Norwegian students from transferring to other schools.

Notable alumni 
 Mohammed Abdellaoue, footballer
 Daniel Braaten, footballer
 Christer George, footballer
 Gunnar Halle, footballer
 Kim Kristian Holmen, footballer and former gymnast
 Bjørnar Holmvik, footballer
 Øystein Pettersen, cross-country skier
 Sune Wentzel, frisbee world champion
 Turid Birkeland, TV journalist

References

Secondary schools in Norway
Schools in Oslo
Oslo Municipality
Educational institutions established in 1962
1962 establishments in Norway